Friedhelm Funkel (born 10 December 1953) is a German football manager and former player, who last managed 1. FC Köln.

Coaching career

Early career
Funkel was manager of Duisburg between 13 May 1996 and 24 March 2000. He finished with a record of 56 wins, 47 draws, and 59 losses.

He was manager of Hansa Rostock from 19 September 2000 to 1 December 2001. He finished with a record of 13 wins, 10 draws, and 22 losses.

He was manager of 1. FC Köln from 14 February 2002 to 30 October 2003. He finished with a record of 29 wins, 15 draws, and 19 losses.

Eintracht Frankfurt
Funkel coached Eintracht Frankfurt from 2004 to 2009. He was subsequently released from his contract on 1 July 2009. He led the club into the Bundesliga in his first season in charge. One year later, he and the team avoided relegation and surprisingly reached the DFB-Pokal final, which eventually sent them to the UEFA Cup.

Tied with Erich Ribbeck, Funkel holds the record for the longest tenure at Eintracht, with five full seasons. He finished with a record of 70 wins, 50 draws, and 74 losses.

Hertha BSC
On 3 October 2009, Hertha BSC introduced Funkel as their new head coach after having fired Lucien Favre. After Hertha was relegated, Funkel and the club mutually agreed to not extend his contract. He finished with a record of seven wins, 10 draws, and 16 losses.

VfL Bochum
On 22 May 2010, he was named new coach of VfL Bochum. His first match was a 3–0 loss to Kickers Offenbach in the first round of the German Cup. He got sacked on 14 September 2011. His final match was a 2–1 loss to Dynamo Dresden. He finished with a record of 21 wins, eight draws, and 16 losses.

Alemannia Aachen
On 20 September 2011, Funkel took over the job as manager of Alemannia Aachen. Funkel was dismissed of his job on 1 April 2012, after a streak of five consecutive losses. He finished with a record of three wins, eight draws, and nine losses in 20 matches.

TSV 1860 Munich
On 7 September 2013, he was named new coach of 1860 Munich. His first match in–charge was a 0–0 draw against VfR Aalen on 13 September 2013. On 2 April 2014, 1860 Munich announced that Funkel is going to leave the club after the season because of "different conceptual views on the orientation in sport." However, 1860 München sacked Funkel on 6 April 2014 after losing to Karlsruher SC 3–0 at home earlier in the day. He finished with a record of seven wins, eight draws, and nine losses in 24 matches.

Fortuna Düsseldorf
Funkel was appointed as the new head coach of Fortuna Düsseldorf on 14 March 2016. He was sacked on 29 January 2020 after six losses in his last eight matches.

1. FC Köln
Funkel was appointed as the new head coach of 1. FC Köln on 11 April 2021 for the remainder of the 2020–21 season.

Personal life
Funkel has two children. He is the older brother of Wolfgang Funkel.

Career statistics

Club

Managerial

Honours

Player
Bayer Uerdingen
DFB-Pokal: 1984–85

References

External links
Friedhelm Funkel at eintracht-archiv.de 

1953 births
Living people
Sportspeople from Neuss
German footballers
Germany B international footballers
German football managers
Bundesliga players
2. Bundesliga players
1. FC Kaiserslautern players
Eintracht Frankfurt managers
KFC Uerdingen 05 players
1. FC Köln managers
FC Hansa Rostock managers
MSV Duisburg managers
Bundesliga managers
Hertha BSC managers
VfL Bochum managers
Alemannia Aachen managers
KFC Uerdingen 05 managers
Fortuna Düsseldorf managers
2. Bundesliga managers
Association football midfielders
Footballers from North Rhine-Westphalia
TSV 1860 Munich managers
West German footballers
West German football managers